Charles Dewey Alexander (October 27, 1897 – 1962) was an American children's writer of short stories and novels.

He was born in Ponca, Nebraska.  At the age of two, he moved to the Albany, Oregon area with his parents.  He attended Albany schools and began working in the printing trade as a teenager, first in his brother's printing shop, then with the Albany Democrat newspaper.
Two hundred of Alexander's short stories were published in magazines such as The Saturday Evening Post, Detective Fiction Weekly, Ace-High Detective Magazine, Blue Book and Sunset.

Alexander, also an expert linotype operator, retired as a full-time worker from the Democrat after 50 years in February 1962.  His wife, Margaret Smith, whom he married in 1917, died in 1958.

Works
Why I Choose to Live in Oregon, Portland, Oregon: Portland Chamber of Commerce, 192-?
Across the Chasm, Chicago, Story-Press, 1922
The Blonde She of Yachats: a New Story of Black Buck, the Great Dog Who Went Back to the Wilderness After the Murder of his Master, Chicago: Story-press, 1922
The Noseless One, Chicago: Story-Press, 1922
The Place of Hisses, Chicago : Story-Press, 1922
The Weasel's Kit, Chicago: Story-Press, 1922
Wolf meets Wolf, Chicago: Story-Press, 1922
The Young of the Wolf, Chicago: Story-Press, 1922
The Fang in the Forest. New York: Dodd, Mead and Company, 1923
The Splendid Summits, New York: Dodd, Mead and Company, 1925
Bobbie, a Great Collie, New York, Dodd, Mead and Company, 1926

See also

Bobbie, the Wonder Dog

References

External links
Guide to the Charles D. Alexander papers at the University of Oregon

1897 births
1962 deaths
People from Albany, Oregon
Writers from Oregon
American children's writers
Typesetters
People from Ponca, Nebraska